Conscious Roots 2 was released in 2005. The album is the 2nd edition of the (NZ) series.

Track listing
Dreams - House of Shem
One Of These Days - Illphonics
This Here Reggae Music - Unity Pacific
So True - Black Seeds
Keep Rising - House of Shem
Forward Movement - Cornerstone Roots
Frisk Me Down - Katchafire
Whistling In The Dark - Kingites
Meaning Of Life - Toki
Burning - Kora
Ernie - Fat Freddys Drop
All We Be - Trinity Roots
True Progress - The Midnights
Lost Your Soul - Hollie Smith

Compilation albums by New Zealand artists
2005 compilation albums
Reggae compilation albums
EMI Records compilation albums